Antoni Maria Badia i Margarit (May 30, 1920 – November 16, 2014) was a Catalan linguist and philologist who produced works on the grammar and history of the Catalan language. He was born in Barcelona.

He graduated in philology or Romance languages at the Universitat de Barcelona in 1943, where he was professor of history of Catalan language and Spanish language. He was rector of Universitat de Barcelona from 1978 to 1986. He is visitor professor of several universities around the world (Munich, Heidelberg, Georgetown, Wisconsin, and Sorbone in Paris). He is doctor honoris causa by several universities (Salzburg, Toulouse, Rovira i Virgili in Tarragona, Sorbone in Paris, and Illes Balears). He has been president of the Société de Linguistique Romane, president of Philology section of Institut d'Estudis Catalans, president of Associació Internacional de Llengua i Literatura Catalanes, president of North-American Catalan Society, president of Deutsch-Katalanische Gesellschaft, and president of Segon Congrés Internacional de la Llengua Catalana (1986). He died in 2014, aged 94.

Biblioteca Badia-Cardús 

In 1975, while the activities of the Congrés de Cultura Catalana were beginning, Badia and his wife Maria Cardús inform about the donation of their library and archive to the Biblioteca de Catalunya. The collection contains more than thousand books, periodicals and leaflets that reflects the studies and teaching in Romance languages and linguistics field, mostly of Catalan language and Spanish language, many of which are unique or very rare.

References

External links 
 Antoni Maria Badia i Margarit at Association of Catalan Language Writers, AELC. Webpage in Catalan with English and Spanish translations.
 Antoni Maria Badia i Margarit at the Institut d'Estudis Catalans
 Biblioteca Badia-Cardús de la Biblioteca de Catalunya

Linguists from Catalonia
Linguists of Catalan
2014 deaths
1920 births
Premi d'Honor de les Lletres Catalanes winners
University of Barcelona alumni
Burials at Montjuïc Cemetery